Lowestoft was a parliamentary constituency centred on the town of Lowestoft in Suffolk.  It returned one Member of Parliament (MP) to the House of Commons of the Parliament of the United Kingdom, elected by the first past the post voting system.

History
The Northern or Lowestoft Division was one of five single-member county divisions of the Parliamentary County of Suffolk created by the Redistribution of Seats Act 1885 to replace the existing two 2-member divisions for the 1885 general election. It was formed from parts of the Eastern Division of Suffolk. It became a county constituency from the 1950 general election and was abolished for the 1983 general election, being replaced by the county constituency of Waveney.

It was more often won by the Conservative Party than not, although its representatives include two from the Liberal Party and one from the Labour Party.

Boundaries and boundary changes
1885–1918: The Borough of Southwold, the Sessional Divisions of Beccles, Bungay, Lothingland, and Mutford, part of the Sessional Division of Blything, and the part of the Borough of Great Yarmouth in the county of Suffolk.

As Great Yarmouth formed a separate Parliamentary Borough, only non-resident freeholders of the Borough were entitled to vote in this constituency.

1918–1950: The Boroughs of Beccles, Lowestoft, and Southwold, the Urban Districts of Bungay and Oulton Broad, the Rural Districts of Mutford and Lothingland, and Wangford, and in the Rural District of Blything the parishes of Benacre, Covehithe, Easton Bavents, Frostenden, Henstead, Reydon, South Cove, and Wrentham.

1950–1983: The Boroughs of Beccles, Lowestoft, and Southwold, the Urban Districts of Bungay and Halesworth, and the Rural Districts of Lothingland and Wainford.

Throughout its existence, the Lowestoft constituency covered the North-Eastern corner of Suffolk and, although encompassing some rural areas, drew the majority of its voters from the towns of Lowestoft, a resort and fishing port, and Beccles; it also included the smaller towns of Bungay and Southwold, with its brewing interests.

Southwold is now in the Suffolk Coastal constituency.

The constituency established in 1885, which was formally named The Northern or Lowestoft Division of Suffolk (and was sometimes referred to simply as "Suffolk North"), also included the town of Halesworth and the rural areas in between. In the boundary changes of 1918, when the constituency became simply the "Lowestoft Division of East Suffolk" or East Suffolk, Lowestoft, Halesworth was transferred to the neighbouring Eye division.

At the 1950 general election, Halesworth was once more placed in the revised Lowestoft County Constituency, but it otherwise underwent only minor changes to reflect local government reorganisation. The boundaries were not altered in the boundary review implemented in 1974.

The constituency was revised in 1983 and renamed Waveney, as its new boundaries were now identical with those of the local government district of that name. The new constituency was very similar to the old Lowestoft one except a small area in the north, including Bradwell (comprising about 10,000 voters), which had been transferred from Suffolk to Norfolk as a result of the Local Government Act 1972, and was now transferred to the county constituency of Great Yarmouth.

Boundary Changes 2024

Under the Boundary Commissions proposals to take place before the next United Kingdom General Election in 2024, it is proposed to abolish the current Waveney constituency, In favour of a new Lowestoft constituency. The proposals would see Lowestoft, Somerleyton and Beccles in the new constituency, whereas Bungay and The Saints would be transferred to the proposed Waveney Valley.

Members of Parliament

Elections

Elections in the 1880s

Elections in the 1890s

Elections in the 1900s

Elections in the 1910s 

General Election 1914–15:

Another General Election was required to take place before the end of 1915. The political parties had been making preparations for an election to take place and by the July 1914, the following candidates had been selected; 
Liberal: Edward Beauchamp
Unionist:

Elections in the 1920s

Elections in the 1930s 

General Election 1939–40:
Another General Election was required to take place before the end of 1940. The political parties had been making preparations for an election to take place from 1939 and by the end of this year, the following candidates had been selected; 
Conservative: Pierse Loftus
Labour: A D Belden
Liberal:

Elections in the 1940s

Elections in the 1950s

Elections in the 1960s

Elections in the 1970s

Elections in the 2020's

References

 Robert Waller, The Almanac of British Politics (1st edition, London: Croom Helm, 1983)
 Frederic A Youngs, jr, Guide to the Local Administrative Units of England, Vol I (London: Royal Historical Society, 1979)
 The Constitutional Year Book, 1913
 

Parliamentary constituencies in Suffolk (historic)
Constituencies of the Parliament of the United Kingdom established in 1885
Constituencies of the Parliament of the United Kingdom disestablished in 1983
Lowestoft